Lyclene weidenhofferi is a moth of the subfamily Arctiinae. It was described by Karel Černý in 2012 and is endemic to Thailand.

References

Nudariina
Moths described in 2012
Endemic fauna of Thailand
Moths of Asia